Forever for Now is the sixth studio album by Canadian rock band April Wine, released in 1977. The album featured a variety of genres including country and western, Latin, Caribbean, blues, easy listening, and rock.

Initially, the album sold moderately, peaking at #19 on the Canadian charts in March before dropping back down. Then the 1950s-style ballad "You Won't Dance with Me" became a surprise hit single, selling more copies than any previous April Wine single and breathing new life into the album's sales. The single and album peaked on their corresponding charts during the same week of July 9, 1977, at #6 and #5, respectively. Both the single and the album were certified platinum in Canada.

Track listing
All tracks written by Myles Goodwyn unless otherwise noted.
 "Forever for Now" – 3:04
 "Child's Garden" – 4:37
 "Lovin' You" – 3:33
 "Holly Would" – 3:44
 "You Won't Dance with Me" – 5:10
 "Come Away" (George Bowser, Peter Jupp) – 3:52
 "Mama Laye" – 4:15
 "I'd Rather be Strong" – 4:41
 "Hard Times" (Jimmy Dean, lyrics by Goodwyn) – 2:39
 "Marjorie" – 3:44

Personnel
 Myles Goodwyn – lead and backing vocals, guitars, piano, string ensemble
 Gary Moffet – guitars, backing vocals
 Jerry Mercer – drums, backing vocals, percussion, vibraphone
 Steve Lang – bass, backing vocals

References

April Wine albums
1977 albums
Aquarius Records (Canada) albums
Albums produced by Myles Goodwyn